Heinrich Kaan (8 February 1816 – 24 May 1893) was a 19th-century physician known for his seminal contributions to early sexology.  Different sources identify him as Ruthenian (an ethnic group living in what is now Belarus and Ukraine) or as Russian. He was the personal physician to the Czar.

Psychopathia Sexualis

Kaan is primarily known for an early scientific approach to sexology i.e. a scientifically based theoretical study of sex as opposed to earlier fields of erotology—the more practical study of lovemaking.
He published his main work Psychopathia Sexualis in 1844 in Leipzig in Latin and it has been translated into English and German. A direct translation of the title is Psychopathies of Sexuality. In this work he reinterpreted the Christian sexual sins as diseases of the mind.

Until then, concepts like deviation, aberration, and perversion were interpreted in a theological context as "false" religious beliefs or heresy.  Kaan's novel idea was to turn them into medical concepts, to reinterpret them as mental diseases. Physicians and psychiatrists after him were quick to take up these ideas - a process which collectively is referred to as the medicalization of sin in cultural history. It is also referred to as "degeneracy theory".

Kaan's work was within the "onanism literature" tradition of his time.  To Kaan, masturbation was at the root of all sexual disorders, deviations and unnatural lusts as it involved extravagant fantasies.  He also considered heterosexual intercourse as psychopathological, if it comprised sexual fantasies. His main goal was to fight such sexual psychopathies, above all masturbation.

Michel Foucault referred to Kaan's work in his mid-1970s lectures on the discourse of the nature of normality and abnormality. According to Foucault Kaan's work was the first medical text exclusively devoted to the study of sexuality. However, Foucault recognized it as a symptom of a shift in the discourse on sexuality, rather than necessarily an influential work in itself. Scholars have acknowledged Kaan's contributions, relative to those of Richard von Krafft-Ebing and Sigmund Freud.

Michel Foucault said during a course of lectures he did in 1974-75 at the Collège de France, that the Psychopathia Sexualis” (1844) “was the first treatise of psychiatry to speak only of sexual pathology but the last (monograph) to speak of sexuality solely in Latin”

See also
 Flesh (theology)
 Religious views on masturbation

Works

 Dissertatio inauguralis medico pharmacologica de Alcaloidibus. Viennae 1840 [Kaan's medical thesis of June 1840]
 Rückerinnerungen aus meinem Badeleben. In Gesundheits-Zeitung, 1840, IV. Jahrg., No. 91, pp. 729-733; No. 103, pp. 825-828
  Lipsiae 1844
 Bericht über die Leistungen der kalten eisenhaltigen Mineralquellen bei St. Petersburg auf dem Landgute des Grafen Koucheleff-Besborodko, unweit Ochta's. In Medizinische Zeitung Russlands, 1844, No. 12, pp. 91-93; 1845, No. 17, 134-135; 1846, No. 16, pp. 126-127
 Versuch einer topographisch-medicinischen Skizze von Meran. Innsbruck 1851
 Gedanken eines Arztes über die Cholera als Weltseuche. Innsbruck 1854
 Psychiatrische Skizzen. In Homöopathische Vierteljahrschrift, 1861, 12. Band, pp. 81-99 [contains a continuation to Psychopathia Sexualis]
 Die Objektivität in der Medicin. In Neue Zeitschrift für Homoeopathische Klinik, 1867, Bd. XII (XVI), No. 16, pp. 121-123
 Der Curgast in Ischl. Wien 1868 (Zweite umgearbeitete Auflage)
 Ischl et ses environs. Vienne 1879

Secondary literature
 
  see pp 233–234 which is not merely passing mention, Kaan's work is identified as "the first text". Kaan is mentioned at some 15 other occasions in that book
  Note: this is a 1998 doctoral thesis that provides a historical perspective of the work of three nineteenth-century authors on sexuality (Hermann Joseph Löwenstein, 1823, Joseph Häussler, 1826, and Heinrich Kaan, 1844). The thesis provides the first full translation of the works of Lowenstein and Kaan from Latin into German - a great service as "Kaan's often quoted book" is linguistically inaccessible to many.  (Text from book review in Hauser 2000:143)
 
  only snippet views, but Kaan's work appears to be discussed over pages 435-437, and there is a verbatim quote on p 437.
  Kaan's work is discussed in this book. 
  
 
  (ref 29 in this publication)
 
 see pp 51–52, p51, a scholar Tardieu is quoted for questioning (the topic is masturbation, homosexuality, etc.) if "these [sexual] vices have other causes than plain spoiled moral or if it is some sort of sexual psychopathy, a term in which he is indebted to Kaan" (own translation from German). In footnote 40 Kaan work was referred to analysis by Foucault in his discouse analysis on abnormality, on p 84 Kaan work is compared with Krafft-Ebing's
 
  Kaan's work is discussed in this book. (note: Annemarie Wettley later married Werner Leibbrand (both are medical historians) and she changed her name to Annemarie Leibbrand-Wettley)

References 

Austro-Hungarian emigrants to the Russian Empire
Austro-Hungarian people
Physicians from the Russian Empire
Writers from the Russian Empire
Austrian medical writers
Physicians from Vienna
1816 births
1893 deaths